Doupi, also called "triple delicacy doupi" (三鲜豆皮, sānxiān dòupí), is a breakfast dish from the city of Wuhan in Hubei province. It is often sold as a street food.

Origin
The name of the food comes from the material of the outside layer, which is made out of a blend of green bean powder, eggs, milk, and flour.

This dish was invented in 1931 by a local chef who improved the traditional Doupi cooking style and later went on to open the famous restaurant named Laotongcheng.

At the beginning, people made doupi as holiday meals at every festival. They made the mung beans mix with the rice and grind them into a paste. Then they spread the paste into a thin pancake named bean skin and let it wrap sticky rice and diced meat. Finally, they fried it. Many years later, doupi became a common breakfast.

Variety
Doupi is filled with fresh meat, eggs and shrimp. In addition, there is another saying that doupi is filled with fresh meat, fresh mushroom and fresh bamboo shoots.

See also

Hubei cuisine

References

External links
 Wuhan breakfast snacks
 A Bit of China: Wuhan's Hubu Alley - Street of Infinite Snacks

Chinese cuisine
Hubei cuisine